Aimé Laussedat (April 19, 1819 – March 19, 1907) was a French scientist, more specifically, an observational astronomer, geodesist, surveyor, photogrammetrist, and cartographer.

Biography
Laussedat was born in Moulins on April 19, 1819.  He was an engineer, researcher and professor at the École polytechnique, then eminent manager at the National Conservatory of Arts and Crafts.  He was a military engineer at the beginning of his career.  He is considered the father of photogrammetry.  He died on March 19, 1907 (at the age of 87), in Paris.

Namesakes
Mount Laussedat
Laussedat Heights

See also 

 Carlos Ibáñez e Ibáñez de Ibero – 1st president of the International Committee for Weights and Measures and president of the International Geodetic Association

References

19th-century French astronomers
Photogrammetrists
1819 births
1907 deaths
French military engineers